Andrew Parsons (July 22, 1817 – June 6, 1855) was an American politician from the U.S. state of Michigan.

Early life in New York
Parsons was born in Hoosick, New York. He was the son of John Parsons, and the grandson of Andrew Parsons, a Revolutionary soldier, who was the son of Phineas Parsons, the son of Samuel Parsons.

Life and politics in Michigan
Parsons moved to Michigan Territory in 1835 and spent the summer teaching in Ann Arbor. In the fall, he explored nearly the entire length of the Grand River valley by canoe, from Jackson to Lake Michigan. He spent the winter working as a store clerk in Ionia County and in the spring went to Marshall to live with his brother, Luke H. Parsons. In the fall of 1836, he moved to Corunna in what was to become Shiawassee County. This area at that time was mostly wilderness, and when it was organized into a county in 1837, Parsons was elected the county's first clerk at the age of nineteen.

Parsons became an attorney, and in 1840 was elected Register of Deeds, then reelected in 1842 and 1844. In 1846, he was elected to the Michigan State Senate from the sixth district and was appointed Prosecuting Attorney in 1848. He became a Regent of the University of Michigan in 1851 and was also elected as ninth lieutenant governor of Michigan in 1852.

Parsons became the tenth governor of Michigan when Robert McClelland resigned in March 1853 to become the Secretary of the Interior under U.S. President Franklin Pierce. During his twenty-two months as governor, tax laws were improved and the practice of depositing surplus state funds in banks was opposed. Parsons did not receive the Democratic Party's nomination for governor in 1854. This may have been due to the fact that the party was split by question of slavery and by the formation of the Republican Party (which held its first convention that year in Jackson, Michigan).

Retirement and death
In 1855, Parsons was elected to the Michigan House of Representatives from Shiawassee County district. He soon fell ill and retired to his farm in Corunna where he died at the age of 37, just five months after leaving office as governor. He is interred at Pinetree Cemetery in Corunna.

He was married to Marrietta Clason and had four children.

His brother, S. Titus Parsons, years later, was also a member of the state house from the same district from 1863–64 and 1867–68, as well as a delegate to Michigan state constitutional convention in 1867.

References

1817 births
1855 deaths
Democratic Party governors of Michigan
Democratic Party Michigan state senators
Democratic Party members of the Michigan House of Representatives
Lieutenant Governors of Michigan
Regents of the University of Michigan
County officials in Michigan
People from Hoosick, New York
Burials in Michigan
People from Corunna, Michigan
19th-century American politicians